Isiah Claudius Collie (born 22 April 1997) is a Bahamian footballer who plays for Cavalier FC and the Bahamian national football team.

International career
Collie made his senior debut for the Bahamas on 29 March 2015 in a 3–0 away defeat to Bermuda in World Cup Qualifying.

References

External links
Profile at University of Charleston

1997 births
Living people
Bahamian footballers
Bahamas international footballers
Association football midfielders
Cavalier FC players
Sportspeople from Nassau, Bahamas